The 1941 Mississippi Southern Southerners football team was an American football team that represented Mississippi Southern College (now known as the University of Southern Mississippi) as a member of the Southern Intercollegiate Athletic Association during the 1941 college football season. In their fifth year under head coach Reed Green, the team compiled a 9–0–1 record.

Schedule

References

Mississippi Southern
Southern Miss Golden Eagles football seasons
College football undefeated seasons
Mississippi Southern Southerners football